Pterostylis antennifera is a species of greenhood orchid native to eastern Australia. It is similar in appearance to Pterostylis parviflora, but can be differentiated by the size and shape of their flowers.

Description 
Flowering occurs from March to May.

Distribution and habitat 
Pterostylis antennifera is found in the states of Queensland and New South Wales, occurring in forested coastal, near coastal, and inland areas between Blackdown Tableland National Park in Queensland and Dubbo in New South Wales. It is common within this range. It grows in a range of forested habitats but most often in woodlands where the understory is sparse. It is capable of growing on slopes and ridges and can sometimes be found growing in shallow soils on rocky outcrops.

Taxonomy and naming 
Speculantha antennifera was first formally described in 2015 by David L. Jones based on a type specimen collected in 1990 from an area to the north-east of Dubbo, New South Wales. The specific epithet was derived from the Latin word antenna, meaning 'feeler', in reference to the thin free points on the lateral sepals. In 2017, Jones and Christopher J. French transferred the species to the genus Pterostylis as P. antennifera in a later edition of Australian Orchid Review.

References 

antennifera
Orchids of Australia
Orchids of Queensland
Orchids of New South Wales
Plants described in 2015
Taxa named by David L. Jones (botanist)